Gas is a full-length album by Australian garage rock band feedtime. It was released on March 24, 2017, through In the Red Records. It was the first full-length effort released by the group in over 20 years, and the first since their second reunion. The record was named as one of the best of 2017 by AllMusic.

Track listing

Personnel
Al Larkin - bass, vocals, artwork
Tom Sturm - drums
Rick Johnson - guitar, vocals
Zephyr Larkin - engineering
Mikey Young - recording, mixing
Carmel - additional vocals

References

External links
 

2017 albums
Feedtime albums
In the Red Records albums